Scott Carnahan (born October 24, 1953) is an American former professional tennis player.

One of the fastest servers of his era, Carnahan entered in national serving competitions and was once recorded at 137 mph at a Tennis magazine sponsored event in Los Angeles. He played collegiate tennis for UC Irvine, where he was a three-time singles All-American and the 1975 NCAA Division II doubles champion with Bob Wright. On the professional tour, he featured in all four grand slam tournaments during his career and ranked in the world's top 200 for singles.

ATP Challenger finals

Doubles: 2 (0–2)

References

External links
 
 

1953 births
Living people
American male tennis players
UC Irvine Anteaters men's tennis players